Melbourne Alexander Gass (December 21, 1938 - December 11, 2018) was a Canadian businessman and politician who served for 9 years as the Member of Parliament for Malpeque.  He served for two years as the leader of the Progressive Conservative Party of Prince Edward Island from 1988 to 1990, before leaving public life.

Gass served as Parliamentary Secretary to the Minister of Fisheries and Oceans from 1984 to 1986.

Electoral record

References 
 

1938 births
2018 deaths
People from Queens County, Prince Edward Island
Progressive Conservative Party of Prince Edward Island MLAs
Progressive Conservative Party of Prince Edward Island leaders
Members of the House of Commons of Canada from Prince Edward Island
Progressive Conservative Party of Canada MPs